Viking Aircraft LLC is an American aircraft manufacturer based in Elkhorn, Wisconsin. The company specializes in the provision of homebuilt aircraft plans for amateur construction.

In 1998 the company was known as Viking Aircraft Inc., but in 2008 seems to have been registered as Viking Aircraft, LLC, with Robin M. Taylor as agent.

The company sells plans for the Bert Sisler-designed Viking SF-2A Cygnet of which more than 100 were flown by 2003. The company also at one time supplied plans for the Rutan Quickie-derived Bob Walters-designed Viking Dragonfly, of which more than 500 were completed by 2003.

Aircraft

References

External links

Aircraft manufacturers of the United States
Homebuilt aircraft